Jelenk is a settlement in the hills east of Trojane in central Slovenia. It is part of the Municipality of Zagorje ob Savi. The area is part of the traditional region of Upper Carniola. It is now included with the rest of the municipality in the Central Sava Statistical Region.

References

External links
Jelenk on Geopedia

Populated places in the Municipality of Zagorje ob Savi